Beynabad or Binabad or Bein Abad may refer to:
 Beynabad, South Khorasan
 Beynabad, Yazd